Guy Robertson Campbell Melville (born 9 December 1968) is a New Zealand rower.

Melville was born in 1968 in Wanganui, New Zealand. He represented New Zealand at the 1992 Summer Olympics. He is listed as New Zealand Olympian athlete number 646 by the New Zealand Olympic Committee.

References

1968 births
Living people
New Zealand male rowers
Rowers at the 1992 Summer Olympics
Olympic rowers of New Zealand
Rowers from Whanganui